Dense is a 2004 American television short film directed and written by Vanessa Williams and Shari Poindexter, and aired on the TV channel Showtime.

Plot 

A man gives his girlfriend an ultimatum: to drop her career to start a family or he will leave her. She begins to question the relationship realizing maybe she was dense.

Cast 

 Lanei Chapman as Yvette
 Michael Ralph as Julius
 Yolonda Ross as Stacey
 Vondie Curtis-Hall as Ross

Festival screenings 

 Martha's Vineyard African American Film Festival, "Some of the entertainers who have presented material at the annual festival include Vanessa A. Williams directorial debut of Dense..."

References

External links 

 

2004 television films
2004 films
2004 drama films
2004 short films
American drama television films
2000s English-language films
2000s American films